Patrick L. McDonough is an American politician. He was previously a Republican member of the Maryland House of Delegates and a candidate for County Executive of Baltimore County, Maryland, in the 2018 and 2022 elections. He represented District 7, which covers Baltimore and Harford Counties, along with fellow Republicans J.B. Jennings and Richard K Impallaria.  He also served in the House from 1979 to 1983 as a Democrat.

Education
McDonough attended Baltimore parochial schools. He then attended Baltimore City College. He later attended the University of Baltimore.

Career
McDonough has been a radio talk show host and producer. He is the president of the Maryland Leadership Council and the Future Leaders of America. He is a founding member of the Maryland Coalition Against Crime. He is a member of the Route 40 Business Civic Association and the Essex-Middle River-White Marsh Chamber of Commerce. He is also active with the Hawthorn Civic Association, the Joppa Residents Council, and the Harford County Pro Life group.

McDonough is also a part of the President's Rally for America and the Classroom Coalition since 2004. He serves as the host for "Inside Annapolis", which is produced by Harford Community College Television. He is co-chair of the Annual Flag-waving Tribute to Victims and Families of 9–11.

McDonough is known for his continual push to make English the official language for the State of Maryland.

In March 2007, a resolution was sponsored by State Senator Nathaniel Exum calling for the state of Maryland to officially apologize for its role in slavery. McDonough criticized the bill as being a "superficial gesture designed to make people feel guilty".  Additionally, he mentioned that, "I don't think apologies solve anything." McDonough was one of six dissenting votes in the House.  Slavery existed in Maryland since 1642, was legally formalized in 1664, and was abolished under Maryland law by a new state constitution in 1864.

In July 2007, McDonough called for the impeachment of Montgomery County Circuit Court Judge Katherine Savage who released a non-English-speaking rape suspect when he demanded a court-appointed interpreter and none were available. The suspect speaks Vai, a West African language. Judge Savage claimed that not having an interpreter denied the suspect his Constitutional right to a speedy trial, as provided by the Sixth Amendment to the United States Constitution. Delegate McDonough maintained that the defendant did not need an interpreter, as he had attended both high school and college in the U.S., and had been successfully interviewed (in English) four times during the course of the investigation.

McDonough's circulated widely in early 2012 as he mounted a legislative challenge to the neighboring District of Columbia's Wildlife Protection Act of 2010.

McDonough's current radio program can be heard on WCBM AM680 radio in Baltimore on Saturday evenings from 8pm to 10pm.

He ran in the 2018 Primary Election as a Republican candidate for County Executive of Baltimore County. He lost the primary to Al Redmer, 55%-44%. During the campaign, he pledged "dramatic and powerful change" if elected, calling for more police and greater efforts to combat gangs and drugs.

On April 18, 2022, McDonough announced he would again run for County Executive of Baltimore County.

Legislative notes
Supports continued criminal prohibition of marijuana, stating in March 2015, regarding legalization, "Who's the winner? The drug dealer. Who's the loser? The community."
Opponent of criminal law reform in regard to non-violent crime, stating in March, 2015, regarding a number of Maryland state bills aimed at reducing incarceration, "Power to the criminal. This is the year of the criminal, apparently."
voted against the Clean Indoor Air Act of 2007 (HB359) BILL INFO-2007 Regular Session-HB 359
voted against in-state tuition for illegal immigrants in 2007 (HB6) 2007 Regular Session - Vote Record 0690
voted for the Healthy Air Act in 2006 (SB154) 2006 Regular Session - Vote Record 0942
voted for slots in 2005 (HB1361) 2005 Regular Session - Vote Record 0152

Election results

2018 Republican Primary Election for Baltimore County Executive 
Voters to choose one:
{|  class="wikitable"
|-
!Name
!Vote
!Percent
!Outcome
|-
|-
|Alfred W. Redmer Jr.
|18,058
|  55.5%
|   Won
|-
|-
|Pat McDonough
|14,487
|  44.5%
|   Lost
|}

2016 General Election for US House of Representatives - Maryland District 2 
Voters to choose one:
{|  class="wikitable"
|-
!Name
!Votes
!Percent
!Outcome
|-
|-
|C. A. Dutch Ruppersberger, Dem.
|192,183
|  62.1%
|   Won
|-
|-
|Pat McDonough, Rep.
|102,577
|  33.1%
|   Lost
|-
|-
|Kristin S. Kasprzak, Libertarian
|14,128
|  4.6%
|   Lost
|-
|Other Write-Ins
|592
|  0.2%
|   Lost
|}

2016 Republican Primary Election for US House of Representatives - Maryland District 2 
Voters to choose one:
{|  class="wikitable"
|-
!Name
!Votes
!Percent
!Outcome
|-
|-
|Pat McDounough
|28,397
|  71.4%
|   Won
|-
|-
|Carl H. Magee, Jr.
|4,195
|  10.6%
|   Lost
|-
|-
|Bill Heine
|3,203
|  8.1%
|   Lost
|-
|-
|Yuripzy Morgan
|2,257
|  5.7%
|   Lost
|-
|-
|Mark Gerard Shell
|1,709
|  4.3%
|   Lost
|}

2014 General Election for Maryland House of Delegates - District 7 
Voters to choose up to three:
{|  class="wikitable"
|-
!Name
!Votes
!Percent
!Outcome
|-
|-
|Pat McDonough, Rep.
|35,627
|  26.9%
|   Won
|-
|-
|Kathy Szeliga, Rep.
|33,197
|  25.0%
|   Won
|-
|-
|Richard K. Impallaria, Rep.
|32,560
|  24.6%
|   Won
|-
|- 
|Bob Bowie, Jr., Dem.
|11,154
|  8.4%
|   Lost
|-
|-
|Norman Gifford, Jr., Dem.
|10,192
|  7.7%
|   Lost
|-
|-
|Pete Definbaugh, Dem.
|9,707
|  7.3%
|   Lost
|-
|Other Write-Ins
|145
|  0.1%
|   Lost
|}

2014 Republican Primary Election for Maryland House of Delegates - District 7 
Voters to choose up to three:
{|  class="wikitable"
|-
!Name
!Votes
!Percent
!Outcome
|-
|-
|Pat McDonough
|6,971
|  29.0%
|   Won
|-
|-
|Kathy Szeliga
|6,125
|  25.5%
|   Won
|-
|-
|Richard K. Impallaria
|5,790
|  24.1%
|   Won
|-
|-
|David Seman
|3,483
|  14.5%
|   Lost
|-
|-
|Tina Sutherland
|1,675
|  7.0%
|   Lost
|}

2010 General Election for Maryland House of Delegates - District 7 
Voters to choose up to three:
{|  class="wikitable"
|-
!Name
!Votes
!Percent
!Outcome
|-
|-
|Pat McDonough, Rep.
|27,217
|  23.1%
|   Won
|-
|-
|Richard K. Impallaria, Rep.
|25,450
|  21.6%
|   Won
|-
|-
|Kathy Szeliga, Rep.
|24,573
|  20.9%
|   Won
|-
|-
|Jeff Beard, Dem.
|14,885
|  12.6%
|   Lost
|-
|-
|Kristina A. Sargent, Dem.
|13,551
|  11.5%
|   Lost
|-
|-
|James Ward Morrow, Dem.
|11,960
|  10.2%
|   Lost
|-
|Other Write-Ins
|111
|  0.1%
|   Lost
|}

2010 Republican Primary Election for Maryland House of Delegates - District 7 
Voters to choose up to three:
{|  class="wikitable"
|-
!Name
!Votes
!Percent
!Outcome
|-
|-
|Pat McDonough
|6,479
|  27.2%
|   Won
|-
|-
|Richard K. Impallaria
|5,678
|  23.8%
|   Won 
|-
|-
|Kathy Szeliga
|4,021
|  16.9%
|   Won
|-
|-
|Brian Bennett
|1,838
|  7.7%
|   Lost
|-
|-
|Marilyn Booker
|1,808
|  7.6%
|   Lost
|-
|-
|Roger Zajdel
|1,783
|  7.5%
|   Lost
|-
|-
|John Cromwell
|1,031
|  4.3%
|   Lost
|-
|-
|Jim Berndt
|873
|  3.7%
|   Lost
|-
|-
|Laine O. C. Clark
|312
|  1.3%
|   Lost
|}

2006 General Election for Maryland House of Delegates – District 7
Voters to choose up to three:
{| class="wikitable"
|-
!Name
!Votes
!Percent
!Outcome
|-
|- 
|Richard K Impallaria, Rep.
|21,333
|  18.7%
|   Won
|-
|-
|J. B. Jennings, Rep.
|21,189
|  18.6%
|   Won
|-
|-
|Pat McDonough, Rep.
|23,184
|  20.3%
|   Won
|-
|-
|Linda W. Hart, Dem.
|17,122
|  15.0%
|   Lost
|-
|-
|Jack Sturgill, Dem.
|15,390
|  13.5%
|   Lost
|-
|-
|Rebecca L. Nelson, Dem.
|13,481
|  11.8%
|   Lost
|-
|-
|Kim Fell, Green
|2,307
|  2.0%
|   Lost
|-
|Other Write-Ins
|83
|  0.1%
|   Lost
|}

2006 Republican Primary Election for House of Delegates - District 7 
Voters to choose up to three:
{|  class="wikitable"
|-
!Name
!Votes
!Percent
!Outrcome
|-
|-
|Pat McDonouogh
|4,214
|  30.1%
|   Won
|-
|-
|-
|J.B. Jennings
|3,798
|  27.1%
|   Won
|-
|Richard K. Impallaria
|3,654
|  26.1%
|   Won
|-
|-
|John T. Laing
|1,499
|  10.7%
|   Lost
|-
|-
|Nikolai Volkoff
|845
|  6.0%
|   Lost
|}

2002 General Election for Maryland House of Delegates – District 7
Voters to choose up to three:
{| class="wikitable"
|-
!Name
!Votes
!Percent
!Outcome
|-
|-
|J. B. Jennings, Rep.
|22,470
|  20.4%
|   Won
|-
|-
|Pat McDonough, Rep.
|20,869
|  18.9%
|   Won
|-
|- 
|Richard Impallaria, Rep.
|18,749
|  17.0%
|   Won
|-
|-
|Nancy M. Hubers, Dem.
|17,092
|  15.5%
|   Lost
|-
|-
|Donna M. Felling, Dem.
|14,205
|  12.9%
|   Lost
|-
|-
|Randy Cogar, Dem.
|13,926
|  12.6%
|   Lost
|-
|-
|Michael F. Linder, Libertarian
|2,817
|  2.6%
|   Lost
|-
|Other Write-Ins
|80
|  0.1%
|   Lost
|}

2002 Republican Primary Election for Maryland House of Delegates - District 7 
Voters to choose up to three:
{|  class="wikitable"
|-
!Name
!Votes
!Percent
!Outcome
|-
|-
|Pat McDonough
|3,191
|  16.9%
|   Won
|-
|-
|J.B. Jennings
|3,126
|  16.5%
|   Won
|-
|-
|Richard K. Impallaria
|2,594
|  13.7%
|   Won
|-
|-
|Sheryl L. Davis-Kohl
|2,473
|  13.1%
|   Lost
|-
|-
|Michael J. Davis
|2,079
|  11.0%
|   Lost
|-
|-
|Dilip B. Paliath
|1,883
|  10.0%
|   Lost
|-
|-
|Christopher Saffer
|1,851
|  9.8%
|   Lost
|-
|-
|Jackie Bailey
|1,708
|  9.0%
|   Lost
|}

1998 General Election for Baltimore County Register of Wills 
Voters to choose one:
{|  class="wikitable"
|-
!Name
!Votes
!Percent
!Outcome
|-
|-
|Grace G. Connolly
|123,896
|  59.7%
|   Won
|-
|-
|Pat McDonough
|83,471
|  40.3%
|   Lost
|}

1996 General Election for the US House of Representatives - Maryland District 3 
Voters to choose one:
{|  class="wikitable"
|-
!Name
!Votes
!Percent
!Outcome
|-
|-
|Ben Cardin, Dem.
|130,204
|  67%
|   Won
|-
|-
|Pat McDounough, Rep
|63,229
|  33%
|   Lost
|}

1996 Republican Primary Election for the US House of Representatives - Maryland District 3 
Voters choose one:
{|  class="wikitable"
|-
!Names
!Votes
!Percent
!Outcome
|-
|-
|Pat McDonough
|12,115
|  70%
|   Won
|-
|-
|Carroll Myers
|3,979
|  23%
|   Lost
|-
|-
|Joseph Cilipote
|1,134
|  7%
|   Lost
|}

References and notes

External links
Pat McDonough's Official Website
Pat McDonough's page on Maryland House of Delegates website

Republican Party members of the Maryland House of Delegates
People from Baltimore County, Maryland
Living people
University of Baltimore alumni
Baltimore City College alumni
21st-century American politicians
20th-century American politicians
Candidates in the 2016 United States elections
Candidates in the 2018 United States elections
Year of birth missing (living people)